Horse Creek Bridge may refer to:

Horse Creek Bridge (Afton, Oklahoma), listed on the National Register of Historic Places in Ottawa County, Oklahoma
Horse Creek Bridge (McKenzie Bridge, Oregon), formerly listed on the National Register of Historic Places in Lane County, Oregon

See also
 Horse Creek (disambiguation)